The , or simply Nagasaki Line, is a railway line owned by the Kyushu Railway Company (JR Kyushu) connecting Tosu Station in Saga Prefecture to Nagasaki Station in Nagasaki Prefecture, Japan. There is a separate branch of this line from Kikitsu Station to Urakami Station by way of Nagayo Station and the Nagasaki Tunnel, avoiding a long detour.

Route data
Operators and route length:
JR Kyushu (services and tracks)
Tosu - Nagasaki: 
Kikitsu - Nagayo - Urakami: 
JR Freight (services)
Tosu - Nagasaki: 
Stations: 41 (including seasonal stations)
Double-tracking:
Tosu - Kōhoku
Isahaya - Kikitsu
Urakami - Nagasaki
Electrification: Tosu - Hizen-Hama (20kV AC 60 Hz)
Railway signalling: Automatic
CTC center: Hakata Integrated Operations Center

Route description
The line is single-tracked between Kōhoku and Isahaya stations due to the coastal geography of the area making double-tracking prohibitively expensive. Prior to the opening of the new route, express and limited express trains ran on this section. The line was electrified in 1976, however due to the lack of freight trains running beyond Nabeshima and low population along the line, the section between Hizen-Hama and Nagasaki is scheduled to be de-electrified after the opening of the Nishi Kyushu Shinkansen.

Services

Limited express
As of 23 September 2022, the Relay Kamome limited express operates on the Nagasaki Main Line until Kōhoku before splitting off to Takeo-Onsen where passengers can board the Nishi Kyushu Shinkansen to Nagasaki. The merged Midori/Huis Ten Bosch limited express operates east of Kōhoku Station with some services operating additionally as a Relay Kamome until Takeo-Onsen. Prior to the opening of the new Shinkansen line, limited express trains travelled over the new route between Isahaya and Urakami stations. Limited Express Relay Kamome trains are operated by JR Kyushu using the 6-car 885 series and 8-car 787 series.  A new limited express service Kasasagi was introduced between Hizen-Kashima and Hakata with through services to Mojiko to make up for the loss of the Kamome along the line using the 6-car 885 series, 8-car 787 series, and 8-car 783 series EMU's. 

Overnight sleeper trains, such as the Sakura (between Tokyo and Nagasaki) and Akatsuki (between Kyoto and Nagasaki), were discontinued in 2008.

Regional trains
Other than trains that are operated on the entire Nagasaki Line, there are trains which operate in specific sections, such as from Tosu to Hizen-Kashima, and trains which continue on to other lines. From of 23 September, all electric trains are slated to be replaced by DMUs and hybrid diesel-electric trains between Hizen-Hama and Nagasaki. 
In the morning, from Hizen-Nanaura Station, there is a direct train to Mojikō Station (on the Kagoshima Main Line). 
The new line from Isahaya to Nagasaki uses EMUs, but the old line, including direct trains to the Omura Line, uses DMUs. However, the rapid service train Seaside Liner, despite being a DMU, uses the new line. 
Between Hizen-Nanaura Station and Yue Station, because it is a relatively inactive part of the line, local trains only run for about five hours into the daytime after the morning rush.
Wanman Driver-only operation trains are operated on the entire Nagasaki Line. On the new line, the 817 series EMU is used, and on the old line, the KiHa 66, 67, and 200 DMUs are used.

Freight
Freight trains are operated between Tosu and Nabeshima. High-speed freight trains make three round trips a day from Tosu Freight Terminal to Nabeshima. The electric locomotive used is the Class ED76. Freight trains only arrive and depart from Nabeshima station.

Stations
Legend
 All trains stop at stations marked "●", some stop at stations marked "▲". All trains pass stations marked "｜".
 Double-tracked sections are marked "∥", single-tracked sections where trains may pass are marked "◇", and single-tracked sections where trains cannot pass are marked "｜"."^" and "∨" indicate a boundary between single- and double-track sections.

New route (via Ichinuno)
 "Rapid" refers to the Seaside Liner rapid service.
 Local trains make all stops. For information on the Relay Kamome, Midori and Huis Ten Bosch limited express services consult their respective articles.

Old route (via Nagayo)
 All stations located within Nagasaki Prefecture.
 All trains make all stops.

Rolling stock
885 series (Relay Kamome,Kasasagi,Midori)
783 series (Midori, Huis ten Bosch)
787 series (Relay Kamome, Midori)
811 series (Between Tosu and Hizen-Ōura)
813 series (Between Tosu and Hizen-Ōura)
817 series 
415 series
KiHa 66/67 DMUs (Seaside Liner)
KiHa 200 DMUs (Seaside Liner)

History
The Kyushu Railway Co. opened the Tosu - Saga section in 1891, extending it to Nagasaki via Haiki in 1898.

In 1907, the Railway Nationalization Act was passed in Japan, nationalising all major railways. The Hizen-Yamaguchi - Isahaya direct line was opened in 1934, with the Hizen-Yamaguchi - Haiki section being renamed the Sasebo Line and the Haiki - Isahaya section the Omura Line.

The Saga - Nabeshima section was the first to be duplicated in 1966, and by 1969 the Tosu - Hizen-Yamaguchi and Isahaya - Kikitsu sections were duplicated. The Urakami-Nagasaki section was duplicated in 1990.

The 6173m Shin-Nagasaki tunnel and associated Kititsu - Urakami deviation opened in 1972, and the entire line was electrified in 1976. Freight services beyond Nabeshima ceased in 1999.

Former connecting lines
 Saga station - The 24 km line to Setaka (on the Kagoshima Main Line) opened 1931-35, and closed in 1987. This line crossed three major watercourses by substantial bridges.

Future plans 
In January 2022, it was announced that the Nagasaki Main Line would be split into two sections and upper and lower management separation is to be introduced. JR Kyushu will continue to operate trains in the two section as a Type 2 Railway Business while the infrastructure of the  section between Hizen-Yamaguchi Station and Isahaya Station is to be maintained by Saga-Nagasaki Railway Management Centre as a Type 3 Railway Business. JR Kyushu is to maintain train operations in this section for the next 23 years after the opening of the Nishi Kyushu Shinkansen. 

On 10 June 2022, JR Kyushu announced further details regarding the section between Hizen-Yamaguchi station and Isahaya Station. The section between Hizen-Hama Station and Nagasaki Station is to be de-electrified with diesel trains replacing all electric trains running in this section. Hizen-Yamaguchi Station is to be renamed to Kohoku Station (江北). To make up for the loss of express trains running in this section, a new express train "Kasasagi" is to operate between Hizen-Kashima Station and Saga Station with services going onwards to Hakata Station. As de-electrification means the joyful train "36 plus 3" will no longer be able to reach Nagasaki Station, a new diesel joyful train "Futatsuboshi 4047" is to operate along the Nagasaki Main Line during the morning run and Omura Line in the afternoon return run.

References

This article incorporates material from the corresponding article in the Japanese Wikipedia

 
Lines of Kyushu Railway Company
Railway lines opened in 1891
1067 mm gauge railways in Japan